Frank Hickey may refer to:
 Frank Hickey (Canadian football)
 Frank Hickey (wrestler)
 J. Frank Hickey, American child molester and serial killer